Houssam Wadi (born August 8, 1986 in Gaza, Palestine) is a Palestinian professional football (soccer) player currently playing for Gazan club Ittihad Shajeiyah after voiding his contract with Al-Am'ary of the West Bank Premier League. He is known for his versatility, able to play as a centre back and holding midfielder. Wadi scored his first official national team goal against Afghanistan in 2014 World Cup qualifying in the first competitive international match played in Palestine.

National Team Goals

References

Living people
Palestinian footballers
Palestine international footballers
1986 births
People from Gaza City
Footballers at the 2006 Asian Games
Association football defenders
Association football midfielders
Asian Games competitors for Palestine
Gaza Strip Premier League players
West Bank Premier League players